Marc Alan Snyder (born January 6, 1961) is an American politician who is the member of the Colorado House of Representatives from the 18th district in El Paso County.

Political career

Election
Snyder was elected in the general election on November 6, 2018, winning 57 percent of the vote over 36 percent of Republican candidate Mary Fabian.

References

Snyder, Marc
Living people
21st-century American politicians
1961 births